The Communist Party (Marxist–Leninist) was a Maoist political party in the United States.

History

The October League 
The Communist Party (Marxist–Leninist)'s predecessor organization, the October League (Marxist–Leninist), was founded in 1971 by several local groups, many of which had grown out of the radical student organization Students for a Democratic Society when SDS split apart in 1969. Michael Klonsky, who had been a national leader in SDS in the late 1960s, was the main leader of the CP(M-L).

The October League came out of the Revolutionary Youth Movement II grouping in the SDS split. During the early 1970s the OL took positions that were at odds with most of the US Left, including opposition to gay liberation and support of the shah of Iran, whose regime they saw as a bulwark against Soviet social-imperialism. The OL characterized homosexuality as a "decadent" bourgeois aspect of class society and held that gay people needed to be "re-educated" after the revolution. Because of OL's anti-gay position, members of the New American Movement's gay caucus objected to the OL's presence at the New American Movement's 1975 convention.

The OL established influence within some of the established civil rights organizations, including the Southern Christian Leadership Conference and the Southern Conference Educational Fund, which had been under the influence of the Moscow-oriented Communist Party USA.

In late 1975 they organized a "National Fight Back Conference", which drew 1,000 participants and was attended by representatives of the August 29th Movement, the Congress of Afrikan People and the Marxist–Leninist Organizing Committee of San Francisco. They also had a youth group called the Communist Youth Organization.

The Communist Party (Marxist–Leninist) 
In June 1977, the October League transformed itself into the Communist Party (Marxist–Leninist), with Klonsky as chairman and Eileen Klehr as vice-chairman.

The CP (ML) supported the Chinese government's purge of the Gang of Four. It was subsequently recognized by the Communist Party of China as their de facto fraternal party in the US. Klonsky and Klehr visited Peking in July 1977 and met with Hua Guofeng. Longtime Black communist Harry Haywood, who had become a CP(M-L) member, also visited with Chinese leaders in June 1978.

In 1978, Daniel Burstein, the editor of the CP (ML) central organ The Call, and three others made an eight-day tour of Khmer Rouge-ruled Cambodia, then a Chinese ally. He visited Phnom Penh as well as Siem Reap, Kompong Thom, Kompong Cham and Takéo provinces and had an interview with Ieng Sary. In an op-ed he wrote in The New York Times he claimed that there was no evidence of genocide, claiming that that was part of a propaganda campaign orchestrated by the regime's enemies. He did concede, however:

The new government has had to deal with many forces that oppose the revolution—former Lon Nol officials, as well as organized networks of American, Russian and Vietnamese agents trying to overthrow the Government. Such sabotage has undoubtedly been met with violent suppression. In the course of this, there may even have been some excesses, which no revolution is immune to.

In early 1980, the CP (ML) condemned the Soviet invasion of Afghanistan and called on President Carter to give aid to the Afghan forces opposing the Soviets, end its arms embargo on China and refrain from selling the USSR any "strategic materials".

The CP (ML) also claimed the Mariel exodus was evidence that the USSR and Fidel Castro had "betrayed" the Cuban Revolution.

Further reading 
On the October League's Call for a New Communist Party: A Response by the Proletarian Unity League. New York: United Labor Press, 1976

Footnotes

External links 
 Wildcat at Mead a film produced by the October League
 Lessons from the Collapse of the Communist Party (Marxist-Leninist) by Carl Davidson

1977 establishments in the United States
Defunct communist parties in the United States
Defunct Marxist–Leninist parties in the United States
Defunct Maoist parties in the United States
Homophobia
Political parties established in 1977
Southern Conference Educational Fund
Organizations that oppose LGBT rights in the United States